Nambé Oweenge Pueblo (/) is a census-designated place (CDP) in Santa Fe County, New Mexico, and is also a federally recognized tribe of Native American Pueblo people.

The Pueblo of Nambé has existed since the 14th century and is a member of the Eight Northern Pueblos. It was a primary cultural, economic, and religious center at the time of the arrival of Spanish colonists in the very early 17th century. Nambé was one of the Pueblos that organized and participated in the Pueblo Revolt of 1680, trying to expel the Spanish from the area.

The community of Nambe, New Mexico, is separate from the pueblo.

Name

Nambé is the Spanish version of a similar-sounding Tewa word, which can be interpreted loosely as meaning "rounded earth." The word "pueblo" stems from the Spanish word for "village." Pueblo refers both to the Southwestern style architecture and the people themselves.

Demographics

The 2010 census found that 1,818 people lived in the CDP, while 568 people in the United States reported being exclusively Nambé and 723 people reported being Nambé exclusively or in combination with another group.

Language

The Nambé language is a dialect of the Tewa language, also called Tano, which belongs to the Kiowa-Tanoan language family.

History

Origin and early history

Scholars believe that all Pueblo peoples are descended from the Ancestral Pueblo people, possibly from the Mogollón, and other ancient peoples. In contemporary times, the people and their archaeological culture were referred to as Anasazi for historical purposes - a Navajo term loosely translated as "Enemy Ancestors" as some Navajo clans are descendants of the Anasazi.  Contemporary Puebloans do not want this term to be used. As the Ancestral Puebloans abandoned their canyon homeland due to social upheaval and climate change, they migrated to other areas. Eventually the Nambé emerged as a culture in their new homeland in present-day New Mexico.

European contact

The Spanish conquistador Juan de Oñate arrived with armed forces in the area in 1598. He forced Nambé Pueblo, as was the case with other pueblos, to start paying him taxes with cotton, crops and labor. Catholic missionaries also came into the area, threatening native religious beliefs. They renamed pueblos with saints' names, and the first church was built in Nambé Pueblo in the early 1600s. The Spanish introduced new foods to the native communities, including peaches, peppers, and wheat. In 1620 a royal decree assigned civil offices to each Pueblo.

Economy

The people of Nambé Pueblo participate in a mixed economy, with many travelling to jobs outside of the Pueblo lands.

Prior to 2020, the Nambé operated a casino on tribal land at the Nambé Falls Travel Center. In 2021, Tesla opened a  service center on Nambé land to service Tesla vehicles, after signing an agreement with Nambé Pueblo leaders. This allowed the first service center to open in the State of New Mexico since state law prohibits automakers from selling direct to consumers, as Tesla does, and state law did not allow Tesla to open a service center without selling cars through intermediary car dealers.  By November 2022, Tesla had followed this model of leasing native American land for a service and delivery center at a second New Mexico city—Santa Ana—which is  closer to the large city of Albuquerque. The store is expected to open in May 2023 and will be five times larger than the first New Mexico facility in Nambe.

Education
The Nambé Pueblo is zoned into Pojoaque Valley Schools. Pojoaque Valley High School is the zoned comprehensive high school.

Notable people 

 Marilyn Bendell, impressionist painter
 Brenda McKenna, member of the New Mexico Senate, 2021
 Margaret Lefranc, painter, illustrator, and editor
 Ben Luján, member and former speaker of the New Mexico House of Representatives
 Ben Ray Luján, former member of U.S. House of Representatives, United States Senator from New Mexico (2021), son of Ben Luján
 Nathaniel A. Owings, architect
 Lonnie Vigil, pottery artist

See also
National Register of Historic Places listings in Santa Fe County, New Mexico

References

External links 

Nambé Pueblo Official Website
Nambé Pueblo on New Mexico Tourism Department website
Nambé Pueblo Pottery

Unincorporated communities in Santa Fe County, New Mexico
Unincorporated communities in New Mexico
Tewa
Native American tribes in New Mexico
Pueblos on the National Register of Historic Places in New Mexico
Tourist attractions in Santa Fe County, New Mexico
Northern Rio Grande National Heritage Area
National Register of Historic Places in Santa Fe County, New Mexico
Adobe buildings and structures in New Mexico
Historic districts on the National Register of Historic Places in New Mexico porn